Stryi Raion is a raion in Lviv Oblast in western Ukraine. Its administrative center is Stryi. Population: . 

On 18 July 2020, as part of the administrative reform of Ukraine, the number of raions of Lviv Oblast was reduced to seven, and the area of Stryi Raion was significantly expanded. Three abolished raions, Mykolaiv, Skole, and Zhydachiv Raions, as well as the cities of Morshyn, Novyi Rozdil, and Stryi, which were previously incorporated as a cities of oblast significance, were merged into Stryi Raion. The January 2020 estimate of the raion population was 

It was established in 1939 as part of Drohobych Oblast.

Subdivisions

Current
After the reform in July 2020, the raion consisted of 14 hromadas:
 Hnizdychiv settlement hromada with the administration in the urban-type settlement of Hnizdychiv, transferred from Zhydachiv Raion;
 Hrabovets-Duliby rural hromada with the administration in the selo of Hrabovets, retained from Stryi Raion;
 Khodoriv urban hromada with the administration in the city of Khodoriv, transferred from Zhydachiv Raion;
 Kozova rural hromada with the administration in the selo of Kozova, transferred from Skole Raion;
 Morshyn urban hromada with the administration in the city of Morshyn, transferred from the city of oblast significance of Morshyn;
 Mykolaiv urban hromada with the administration in the city of Mykolaiv, transferred from Mykolaiv Raion;
 Novyi Rozdil urban hromada with the administration in the city of Novyi Rozdil, transferred from the city of oblast significance of Novyi Rozdil;
 Rozvadiv rural hromada with the administration in the selo of Rozvadiv, transferred from Mykolaiv Raion;
 Skole urban hromada with the administration in the city of Skole, transferred from Skole Raion;
 Slavske settlement hromada with the administration in the urban-type settlement of Slavske, transferred from Skole Raion;
 Stryi urban hromada with the administration in the city of Stryi, transferred from the city of oblast significance of Stryi;
 Trostianets rural hromada with the administration in the selo of Trostianets, transferred from Mykolaiv Raion;
 Zhuravne settlement hromada with the administration in the urban-type settlement of Zhuravne, transferred from Zhydachiv Raion;
 Zhydachiv urban hromada with the administration in the city of Zhydachiv, transferred from Zhydachiv Raion.

Before 2020

Before the 2020 reform, the raion consisted of one hromada, Hrabovets-Duliby rural hromada with the administration in Hrabovets.

See also
 Administrative divisions of Lviv Oblast

References

 
Raions of Lviv Oblast
Raions of Drohobych Oblast
1939 establishments in Ukraine